Henry Rolling (born September 8, 1965 in Fort Eustis, Virginia) is a former American football linebacker in the National Football League. He was drafted by the Tampa Bay Buccaneers in the fifth round of the 1987 NFL Draft. He played college football at University of Nevada.

Rolling also played for the San Diego Chargers and Los Angeles Rams. Rolling's son, Josh is currently a three sport athlete at Bishop Manogue High School.

References

1965 births
Living people
American football linebackers
Nevada Wolf Pack football players
Tampa Bay Buccaneers players
San Diego Chargers players
Los Angeles Rams players